Donald Knight Wilgus (December 1, 1918 – December 25, 1989) was an American folk song scholar and academic, most recognized for chronicling 'Hillbilly', blues music and Irish-American song and his contribution to ballad scholarship.

Early life and education 
Wilgus was born on December 1, 1918, at West Mansfield, Logan County, Ohio, and attended East High School (Columbus, Ohio) and obtained his B.A., M.A. and Ph.D. degrees at Ohio State University.

Wilgus's M.A. thesis has been cited as "the first academic study of commercially recorded country music". His doctoral dissertation, given in 1954 was awarded the 1956 Chicago Folklore Prize. It formed the basis for his Anglo-American Folksong Scholarship since 1898 (1959), which was described in the 1990s as "still the definitive work on the subject".

Career 
Wilgus worked as an administrator at Purdue University (1941–1942) and served in the U.S. Army 1942–1945. From 1950 to 1963 he taught at Western Kentucky State College, as associate professor and, from 1961, full professor. In 1955, Wilgus founded the Kentucky Folklore Record, which he edited until 1961.

Wilgus moved to University of California, Los Angeles (UCLA) in 1963.  At UCLA he was professor of music and English at from 1963 until his death in 1989. At the university, together with his colleague Wayland D. Hand, Wilgus established the discipline of folklore studies.  Wilgus was the first chair of the Folklore & Mythology Program at UCLA, a post he held from its founding in 1965 until 1982.

Wilgus also organized and directed five folk festivals on the UCLA campus, suggestive of his interest in the performance as well as of the study of folklore.

During his career, Wilgus carried out fieldwork around the Cumberland River, in Kentucky and Tennessee (with Lynwood Montell and around Ireland, recording the singers Tom Munnelly and John Reilly.  His work around the Cumberland River made the case for the blues ballad to be seen as a subgenre of American balladry.

Recognition 
Between 1971 and 1972, Wilgus served as president of the American Folklore Society (AFS).  His presidential lecture was titled 'The Text is the Thing' and has been described as "a lively response to the [then] current fashion in the field for performance studies".

Wilgus also served as vice-president of the AFS, secretary-treasurer of the Kentucky Folklore Society and president of the California Folklore Society. He also edited the journal of the California Folklore Society, Western Folklore, from 1970 to 1975.

In 1955 he was awarded a Guggenheim Fellowship in the field of Folklore and popular culture.

Death 
Wilgus died on December 25, 1989, in Los Angeles.

Archive 
The Ethnomusicology Archive at UCLA includes the D.K. Wilgus Collection, his collection of 3,000 field recordings and 8,000 commercial recordings of folk music. It was donated by Wilgus's widow, Eleanor R. Long-Wilgus, an eminent ballad scholar in her own right and who had collaborated with Wilgus on research into blues and Irish ballads.

Selected publications 
 Wilgus, D. K. (1959). Anglo-American folksong scholarship since 1898. New Brunswick, NJ. . . 
 Wilgus, D.K. (1964). 'Folksong and Folksong Scholarship: Changing Approaches and Attitudes. IV: The Rationalistic Approach', in A Good Tale and a Bonnie Tune, ed. Mody C.Boatright, Wilson M.Hudson, and Allen Maxwell. Publications of the Texas Folklore Society No. 32. Dallas: Southern Methodist University Press, pp. 227–237, 268. . . 
 Wilgus, D.K. (1965). 'An Introduction to the Study of Hillbilly Music'. Journal of American Folklore 78:195– 203. . . 
 Wilgus, D.K. (1970). 'A Type-Index of Anglo-American Traditional Narrative Songs'. Journal of the Folklore Institute 7:161–170. . . 
 Wilgus, D.K. (1971). Country-Western Music and the Urban Hillbilly. In The Urban Experience and Folk Tradition, ed. Americo Paredes and Ellen J.Stekert. American Folklore Society Bibliographical and Special Series Vol. 22. Austin: University of Texas Press, pp. 137–159 . . 
 Wilgus, D.K. (1973). 'The Text Is the Thing'. Journal of American Folklore 86:241–252. . . 
 Wilgus, D.K.(1986). 'The Comparative Approach'. in The Ballad and the Scholars: Approaches to Ballad Study, ed. D.K. Wilgus and Barre Toelken. Papers presented at a Clark Library Seminar, October 22, 1983. Los Angeles: William Andrews Clark Memorial Library, University of California, pp. 3–28. .   
 Wilgus, D.K., and Eleanor R.Long (1985). 'The Blues Ballad and the Genesis of Style in Traditional Narrative Song', in Narrative Folksong, New Directions: Essays in Appreciation of W. Edson Richmond, ed. Carol L. Edwards and Kathleen E.B.Manley. Boulder, CO: Westview, pp. 435– 482. .

References

External links 
 Image of Wilgus recording blues guitarist Son House at the 3rd annual UCLA Folk Festival, 1965

1918 births
1989 deaths
American folklorists
Ohio State University alumni
University of California, Los Angeles faculty
Western Kentucky University faculty
20th-century American musicologists
Presidents of the American Folklore Society